is a Japanese actress.

Career
Suzuki co-starred in Shunji Iwai's Hana and Alice with Yū Aoi. She voiced the title character Ray Steam in Katsuhiro Otomo's animated film Steamboy.

Suzuki played a supporting role in Andrew Lau and Alan Mak's Initial D, a film based on the Japanese comic series. She co-starred in Ryuichi Hiroki's yakuza film The Egoists with Kengo Kora.

Suzuki has also appeared in films such as Takashi Yamazaki's Returner (2002), Takahisa Zeze's Moon Child (2003), and Yoshimitsu Morita's Tsubaki Sanjuro (2007).

Filmography

Film
 Snow Falling on Cedars (1999) - Young Hatsue Imada
 Juvenile (2000)
 Pokémon 4Ever (2001) Miku (Diana in the English dub)
 Returner (2002) – Milly
 Moon Child (2003)
 The Blue Light (2003)
 9 Souls (2003)
 Steamboy (2004) – Ray Steam (voice)
 Hana and Alice (2004) – Hana Arai
 Initial D (2005) – Natsuki Mogi
 Hanging Garden (2005)
 Tsubaki Sanjuro (2007)
 Glory to the Filmmaker! (2007)
 Kissho Tennyo (2007)
 Himizu (2011)
 Mahoro Ekimae Tada Benriken (2011)
 The Egoists (2011) – Michiko
 Helter Skelter (2012)
 The Ravine of Goodbye (2013)
 The Case of Hana & Alice (2015) – Hana Arai (voice)
 Ashita ni Kakeru Hashi (2018) – Miyuki
 Ride or Die (2021) – Yu Nagasawa
 Ghost Book (2022) – Itsuki's mother

Television
 Kindaichi shonen no Jikenbo (1996), Mizuho Tsuzuki
 The 6th Sayoko (2000), Rei Shioda
 The Kindaichi Case Files (2001), Miyuki Nanase 
 Akahige (2002)
 Stand Up!! (2003)
 The Blue Light (2003)
 Ganbatte Ikimasshoi (2005)
 Burning Flower (2015), Tatsuji
 Lost Man Found (2022)

References

External links
 
 
 

Japanese voice actresses
1987 births
Living people
Voice actresses from Tokyo
Actresses from Tokyo
Japanese film actresses
Japanese television actresses